Vigoride is a space tug that is under development by Momentus Space.  The total payload capacity that it can support to LEO is 750 kg.  Vigoride is capable of changing orbital planes, inclination, and propelling spacecraft to up to 2 km/s.  It also provides small satellite operators access to power, communications, and station keeping while with the tug.  Momentus states that the cost is roughly 15,000 per kg depending on the exact customer specifications.  Vigoride uses a microwave electrothermal thruster (MET) and water as the propellant.  In 2019, the first test of the MET in space was completed and was deemed a success in a press release, while the U.S. Securities and Exchange Commission accused it of misleading investors. The maiden launch was originally scheduled for January 2021, but was delayed due to Momentus not being able to receive FAA approval before the launch. On 22 March 2021, a Vigoride mock-up named Vigoride SC was launched in place of a functional Vigoride. In October 2020, the company stated that it had already booked 1.5 Vigorides out of the 3 planned to be launched in December 2021. On 25 May 2022, Momentus launched its first Vigoride spacecraft aboard SpaceX Transporter 5 mission.

Missions

Past missions

Upcoming missions

References 

Spacecraft launched in 2022
Spacecraft launched in 2023
Space tugs